O făclie de Paşte or O făclie de Paşti (Romanian for "An Easter Torch") is a naturalistic novella written by Romanian writer Ion Luca Caragiale. It was first published in Convorbiri Literare (no. XXIII/1889–1890) and as a self-standing brochure in 1892. Subsequently it was included in many anthologies and editions of Caragiale's prose.

References 

Romanian novellas
Works by Ion Luca Caragiale